Vehkalahden Veikot is a sports club in Hamina founded in 1911 with the sports: orienteering, cross-country skiing, athletics and pesäpallo.

Orienteering 
The club won the Jukola relay in 1983 and 2006.  Tero Föhr, Marc Lauenstein, Baptiste Rollier and Anni-Maija Fincke have represented the club.

Awards 
The club received the award  in at the  2012 for its varied and good activities.

References 

Hamina
Orienteering clubs in Finland
Sports clubs established in 1911